Agustin de Hinojosa y Montalvo,  O.F.M. (1575 – 5 July 1631) was a Roman Catholic prelate who served as Bishop of Nicaragua (1630–1631).

Biography
Agustin de Hinojosa y Montalvo was born in Madrid, Spain in 1575 and ordained a priest in the Order of Friars Minor.
On 12 August 1630, he was appointed during the papacy of Pope Urban VIII as Bishop of Nicaragua. On 16 September 1630, he was consecrated bishop by Juan Guzman, Archbishop of Tarragona with Francisco Olivares Maldonado, Auxiliary Bishop of Toledo, and Cristóforo Chrisostome Carletti, Bishop of Termia, serving as co-consecrators. He served as Bishop of Nicaragua until his death on 5 July 1631.

References

External links and additional sources
 (for Chronology of Bishops) 
 (for Chronology of Bishops) 

17th-century Roman Catholic bishops in Nicaragua
Bishops appointed by Pope Urban VIII
1575 births
1631 deaths
People from Madrid
Franciscan bishops
Roman Catholic bishops of León in Nicaragua